Ship-breaking (also known as ship recycling, ship demolition, ship dismantling, or ship cracking) is a type of ship disposal involving the breaking up of ships for either a source of parts, which can be sold for re-use, or for the extraction of raw materials, chiefly scrap. Modern ships have a lifespan of 25 to 30 years before corrosion, metal fatigue and a lack of parts render them uneconomical to operate. Ship-breaking allows the materials from the ship, especially steel, to be recycled and made into new products. This lowers the demand for mined iron ore and reduces energy use in the steelmaking process. Fixtures and other equipment on board the vessels can also be reused. While ship-breaking is sustainable, there are concerns about the use by poorer countries without stringent environmental legislation. It is also labour-intensive, and considered one of the world's most dangerous industries.

In 2012, roughly 1,250 ocean ships were broken down, and their average age was 26 years. In 2013, the world total of demolished ships amounted to 29,052,000 tonnes, 92% of which were demolished in Asia. As of January 2020, Alang Ship Breaking Yard (India) has the largest global share at 30%, followed by Chittagong Ship Breaking Yard (Bangladesh) and Gadani Ship Breaking Yard (Pakistan).

The largest sources of ships are China, Greece and Germany, respectively, although there is a greater variation in the source of carriers versus their disposal. The ship-breaking yards of India, Bangladesh, China and Pakistan employ 225,000 workers as well as providing many indirect jobs. In Bangladesh, the recycled steel covers 20% of the country's needs and in India it is almost 10%.

As an alternative to ship-breaking, ships may be sunk to create artificial reefs after legally mandated removal of hazardous materials (though this does not recycle any materials), or sunk in deep ocean waters. Storage is a viable temporary option, whether on land or afloat, though most ships will be eventually scrapped; some will be sunk, or preserved as museums.

History
Wooden-hulled ships were simply set on fire or "conveniently sunk". In Tudor times (1485–1603), ships were dismantled and the timber re-used. This procedure was no longer applicable with the advent of metal-hulled boats in the 19th century.

In 1880 Denny Brothers of Dumbarton used forgings made from scrap maritime steel in their shipbuilding. Many other nations began to purchase British ships for scrap by the late 19th century, including Germany, Italy, the Netherlands and Japan. The Italian industry started in 1892, and the Japanese industry after the passing of an 1896 law to subsidise native shipbuilding.

After suffering damage or disaster, liner operators did not want the name of a broken ship to tarnish the brand of their passenger services. Many Victorian ships made their final voyages with the final letter of their name chipped off.

In the 1930s it became cheaper to "beach" a boat by running her ashore—as opposed to using a dry dock. The ship would have to weigh as little as possible and would run ashore at full speed. Dismantling operations required a  rise of tide and close proximity to a steel-works. Electric shears, a wrecking ball and oxy-acetylene torches were used. The technique of the time closely resembles that used in developing countries . Thos. W. Ward Ltd., one of the largest breakers in the United Kingdom in the 1930s, would recondition and sell all furniture and machinery. However, any weapons and military information, even if obsolete, were carefully removed by Navy personnel before turning over the ship for scrapping.

In 2020, as the COVID-19 pandemic crippled the cruise ship trade, cruise vessels began to appear more frequently in ship-breaking facilities.

Location trends 
Until the late 20th century the majority of ship-breaking activity took place in the port cities of industrialized countries such as the United Kingdom and the United States.  those dismantlers that still remain in the United States work primarily on government-surplus vessels.

Starting in the mid-20th century, East Asian countries with lower labour costs began to dominate ship-breaking. As labour costs rose, centres of the ship-breaking industry moved—initially from countries such as Japan and Hong Kong, to Korea and Taiwan and then to China. For example, the southern port city of Kaohsiung in Taiwan operated as the world's leading dismantling site in the late 1960s and 1970s, breaking up 220 ships totaling 1.6 million tons in 1972 alone; in 1977 Taiwan continued to dominate the industry with more than half the market share, followed by Spain and Pakistan. At the time, Bangladesh had no capacity at all. However, the sector is volatile and fluctuates wildly, and Taiwan processed just two ships 13 years later as wages across East Asia rose.

In 1960, after a severe cyclone, the Greek ship M D Alpine was stranded on the shores of Sitakunda, Chittagong (then part of East Pakistan). It could not be re-floated and so remained there for several years. In 1965 the Chittagong Steel House bought the ship and had it scrapped. It took years to scrap the vessel, but the work gave birth to the industry in Bangladesh.
Until 1980 the Gadani Ship Breaking Yard of Pakistan was the largest ship-breaking yard in the world.

Tightening environmental regulations resulted in increased hazardous waste disposal costs in industrialised countries in the 1980s, causing the export of retired ships to lower-income areas, chiefly in South Asia. This, in turn, created a far worse environmental problem, subsequently leading to the Basel Convention of 1989. In 2004 a Basel Convention decision officially classified old ships as "toxic waste", preventing them from leaving a country without the permission of the importing state. This has led to a resurgence of recycling in environmentally compliant locations in developed countries, especially in former ship-building yards.

On 31 December 2005 the French Navy's  left Toulon to be dismantled in Alang, India—despite protests over improper disposal capabilities and facilities for the toxic wastes. On 6 January 2006 the Supreme Court of India temporarily denied access to Alang, and the French Conseil d'État ordered Clemenceau to return to French waters. Able UK in Hartlepool received a new disassembly contract to use accepted practices in scrapping the ship. The dismantling started on 18 November 2009 and the break-up was completed by the end of 2010; the event was considered a turning point in the treatment of redundant vessels. Europe and the United States have had a resurgence in ship scrapping since the 1990s.

In 2009 the Bangladesh Environmental Lawyers Association won a legal case prohibiting all substandard ship-breaking. For 14 months the industry could not import ships and thousands of jobs were lost before the ban was annulled. That same year, the global recession and lower demand for goods led to an increase in the supply of ships for decommissioning. The rate of scrapping is inversely correlated to the freight price, which collapsed in 2009.

Technique

The decommissioning process is entirely different in developed countries than it is in third world countries. In both cases, ship-breakers bid for the ship, and the highest bidder wins the contract. The ship-breaker then acquires the vessel from the international broker who deals in outdated ships. The price paid is around $400 per tonne and the poorer the environmental legislation the higher the price. The purchase of water-craft makes up 69% of the income earned by the industry in Bangladesh, versus 2% for labour costs. The ship is taken to the decommissioning location either under its own power or with the use of tugs.

Developing countries 

In developing countries, chiefly the Indian subcontinent, ships are run ashore on gently sloping sand tidal beaches at high tide so that they can be accessed for disassembly. In the beaching method, no external source of energy is used to pull the ship, as opposed to the dry dock method of ship recycling where a ship is brought inside dry dock by consuming huge energy. However, maneuvering a large ship onto a beach at high speed takes skill and daring even for a specialist captain, and is not always successful. Next, the anchor is dropped to steady the ship and the engine is shut down. It takes 50 labourers about three months to break down a normal-sized cargo vessel of about 40,000 tonnes.

Before the decommissioning begins, various clearances and permissions are obtained from regulatory, pollution and customs authorities after a thorough inspection is conducted by them. The ship recycling process then begins with the draining of fuel, hydraulic fluid, coolant, lubricating oils and firefighting liquid. Any kind of waste such as plastic, garbage, or oily sand is sent to waste treatment facilities, like the Common Hazardous Waste Treatment Storage Disposal Facility (CHW-TSDF) set up by the Gujarat Maritime Board in Alang. Any usable oil is sent to government authorized refineries where used oil is chemically treated. The next steps entail recovering unused and partially spent materials, disposal of bilge water, recovering and obtaining reusable materials, and safe disposal of bio-hazardous materials like asbestos and glass wool. Each of these materials are inspected and sent to regulated waste treatment facilities or to buyers for further use and processing.

In recycling yards in the Indian subcontinent, specifically in Alang, upgraded facilities such as 100% impervious floors with drainage systems, heavy-lift cranes, yard and vessel-specific training for workers, and the development and implementation of Ship Recycling Facility Plans and Ship Recycling Plans (as per IMO's guidelines in Resolutions MEPC.210(63) and MEPC.196(62)) have been implemented.

Developed countries 

In developed countries the dismantling process should mirror the technical guidelines for the environmentally sound management of the full and partial dismantling of ships, published by the Basel Convention in 2003. Recycling rates of 98% can be achieved in these facilities.

Prior to dismantling, an inventory of dangerous substances should be compiled. All hazardous materials and liquids, such as bilge water, are removed before disassembly. Holes should be bored for ventilation and all flammable vapours are extracted.

Vessels are initially taken to a dry dock or a pier, although a dry dock is considered more environmentally friendly because all spillage is contained and can easily be cleaned up. Floating is, however, cheaper than a dry dock. Stormwater discharge facilities will stop an overflow of toxic liquid into the waterways. The carrier is then secured to ensure its stability. Often the propeller is removed beforehand to allow the watercraft to be moved into shallower water.

Workers must completely strip the ship down to a bare hull, with objects cut free using saws, grinders, abrasive cutting wheels, hand-held shears, plasma, and gas torches. Anything of value, such as spare parts and electronic equipment is sold for re-use, although labour costs mean that low-value items are not economical to sell. The Basel Convention demands that all yards separate hazardous and non-hazardous waste and have appropriate storage units, and this must be done before the hull is cut up. Asbestos, found in the engine room, is isolated and stored in custom-made plastic wrapping prior to being placed in secure steel containers, which are then landfilled.

Many hazardous wastes can be recycled into new products. Examples include lead-acid batteries or electronic circuit boards. Another commonly used treatment is cement-based solidification and stabilization. Cement kilns are used because they can treat a range of hazardous wastes by improving physical characteristics and decreasing the toxicity and transmission of contaminants. Hazardous waste may also be "destroyed" by incinerating it at a high temperature; flammable wastes can sometimes be burned as energy sources. Some hazardous waste types may be eliminated using pyrolysis in a high-temperature electrical arc, in inert conditions to avoid combustion. This treatment method may be preferable to high-temperature incineration in some circumstances such as in the destruction of concentrated organic waste types, including PCBs, pesticides, and other persistent organic pollutants. Dangerous chemicals can also be permanently stored in landfills as long as leaching is prevented.

Valuable metals, such as copper or aluminum in electric cable, that are mixed with other materials may be recovered by the use of shredders and separators in the same fashion as e-waste recycling. The shredders cut the electronics into metallic and non-metallic pieces. Metals are extracted using magnetic separators, air flotation separator columns, shaker tables, or eddy currents. Plastic almost always contains regulated hazardous waste (e.g., asbestos, PCBs, hydrocarbons) and cannot be melted down.

Large objects, such as engine parts, are extracted and sold as they become accessible. The hull is cut into 300-tonne sections, starting with the upper deck and working slowly downwards. While oxy-acetylene gas torches are most commonly used, detonation charges can quickly remove large sections of the hull. These sections are transported to an electric arc furnace to be melted down into new ferrous products, though toxic paint must be stripped prior to heating.

Historical techniques
At Kaohsiung in the late 1960s and '70s, ships to be scrapped were tied up at berths in Dah Jen and Dah Lin Pu, at the southern end of Kaohsiung Harbor. A typical 5,000-ton ship could be broken up in 25 to 30 days.

The process began with "cleaning", a process in which subcontractors would come on board the ship to strip it of loose and flammable items, which were often resold in second-hand shops. After that, the cutting crews would start to dismantle the hull, stern first; large sections were cut off the ship and moved via cranes and rigging taken from previously scrapped ships. Because the scrapping at Kaohsiung was done at the docks, scrap metal was placed on trucks waiting to transport it to Kaohsiung's mills.

Conventions and Regulations

The Basel Convention 
The Basel Convention on the Control of Trans-boundary Movements of Hazardous Wastes and Their Disposal of 1989 was the first convention to environmentally govern the ship breaking industry. It has been ratified by 187 countries, including India and Bangladesh. It controls the international movement of hazardous wastes and for their environmentally sound management mainly through consent for the shipment between the authorities of the country exporting the hazardous wastes with the authorities of the importing country.

Though the Basel Convention has notably reduced illegal exports of hazardous wastes to countries that are unable to process and dispose of them in an environmentally sound manner, it has failed to define the minimum standards of recycling soundly. It also completely ignores important aspects such as workers' safety and falls short in overcoming bureaucratic barriers when it comes to communication between exporting and importing countries. Furthermore, the decision to scrap a ship is often made in international waters, where the convention has no jurisdiction.

The "Ban Amendment" to the Basel Convention was adopted in March 1994, prohibiting the export of hazardous wastes from OECD countries to non-OECD countries. The Amendment will enter into force 90 days after it has been ratified by at least three-quarters of the 87 countries that were Parties to the Convention at the time it was adopted. Croatia deposited the 66th ratification in September 2019, and the Ban Amendment will enter into force on December 5, 2019, twenty-five years after it was adopted. However, the European Union has already enacted the Ban Amendment unilaterally through the European Waste Shipment Regulation, which incorporates the Basel Convention and the Ban Amendment into European Union law. Since February 1993, the European Union has incorporated the Basel Convention into European law. In 2006, the European Union replaced its previous regulation with the Waste Shipment Regulation (EC) No 1013/2006 (the WSR), which also unilaterally implemented the Ban Amendment, prohibiting the export of hazardous wastes from European Union member states to any developing (i.e. non-OECD), countries and regulating their export to OECD countries through the Basel Convention's prior informed consent mechanism. 

When the European Commission attempted to apply the WSR to end-of-life ships, it encountered numerous obstacles and evasion. This is because, in enforcing the Ban Amendment, the European Waste WSR considers it illegal to recycle any ship that has started its last voyage from a European Union port in Bangladesh, China, India, or Pakistan, regardless of the flag the ship flies. These four non-OECD countries have consistently recycled around 95% of the world's tonnage. In fact, according to a study conducted by the European Commission in 2011, at least 91% of ships covered by the WSR disobeyed or circumvented its requirements. The European Commission admitted publicly that enforcing its own Waste Shipment Regulation to recycle ships had not been successful. The Commission, unable to wait for the HKC to take effect, began developing new legislation to regulate the recycling of European-flagged ships. This led the European Commission in 2012 to propose the development of a new European Regulation on Ship Recycling.

The Hong Kong Convention 
To overcome the difficulties of the Basel Convention in terms of the inordinate time and effort required in gaining the consent of all countries involved in its due time, and to highlight regulations that this convention left out, its governing body requested the International Maritime Organisation for a newer convention in 2004. Thus, the Hong Kong Convention came into existence. In essence, the Convention aims to ensure that ships, when being recycled after reaching the end of their operational lives, do not pose any unnecessary risks to human health, safety and the environment. The convention covers regulations including:

 the design, construction, operation and preparation of ships to facilitate safe and environmentally sound recycling, without compromising the safety and operational efficiency of ships;
 the operation of ship recycling facilities in a safe and environmentally sound manner; and
 the establishment of an appropriate enforcement mechanism for ship recycling (certification/reporting requirements).

With much more sound standards of ship recycling, easier implementation and better supervision, the Hong Kong Convention was finally adopted in 2009. However, the Convention will only come into universal force 24 months after the date on which the following conditions are met:

 ratification or accession by 15 States,
 the fleet of the States that have ratified or acceded to represent at least 40 percent of world merchant shipping by gross tonnage, and
 the combined maximum annual ship recycling volume of the States during the preceding 10 years to constitute not less than 3 percent of the gross tonnage of the combined merchant shipping of the same States.

As of 30 November 2021, 17 countries have acceded to the HKC, making up 29.77% of the world's merchant shipping by gross tonnage, with a combined maximum annual ship recycling volume of the States at 2.6% of the gross tonnage of the combined merchant shipping of the same States. This leaves the second and third conditions yet to be fulfilled for the HKC to enter into force.

Nearly 96 of India's 120 operational ship recycling yards have achieved Statements of Compliance (SoC) with the Hong Kong Convention by various IACS class societies—including ClassNK, IRClass, Lloyd's Register and RINA. In addition, a yard in Chattogram, Bangladesh has also become the first one to achieve an SoC by ClassNK in January 2020, having first achieved a RINA SoC in 2017. Furthermore, to encourage the growth of India's vital ship recycling sector, in November 2019, the Government of India acceded to the Hong Kong Convention for Safe and Environmentally Sound Recycling of Ships and became the only South Asian country and major ship recycling destination so far to take such a step.

The EU Ship Recycling Regulation 
Most recently, in March 2012, the European Commission proposed tougher regulations to ensure all parties take responsibility. The aim of the EUSRR was to facilitate the early ratification of the Hong Kong Convention; however, it differs from the HKC in the way yards are authorised and in its list of inventories of hazardous materials, or IHM. Under this regulation, if a vessel has a European flag, it must be disposed of in a shipyard on an EU "green list." The facilities would have to show that they are compliant and regulated internationally to bypass corrupt local authorities.

This list, as of 11 November 2020, comprises 43 yards, including 34 yards in Europe, eight yards in Turkey, and one yard in the USA. The list excluded some of the most major ship recycling yards in India and Bangladesh, which have achieved SoCs with the HKC in various class societies. This exclusion has led to many ship owners changing the flag to evade the regulations, and many excluded countries to strive towards bringing the HKC into force as the universal regulation, arguing that it would be irrational if international shipping were regulated by multiple and competing standards.

Risks

Health risks

Seventy percent of ships are simply run ashore in developing countries for disassembly, where (particularly in older vessels) potentially toxic materials such as asbestos, lead, polychlorinated biphenyls and heavy metals along with lax industrial safety standards pose a danger for the workers. Burns from explosions and fire, suffocation, mutilation from falling metal, cancer and disease from toxins are regular occurrences in the industry. Asbestos was used heavily in ship construction until it was finally banned in most of the developed world in the mid-1980s. Currently, the costs associated with removing asbestos, along with the potentially expensive insurance and health risks, have meant that ship-breaking in most developed countries is no longer economically viable. Dangerous vapors and fumes from burning materials can be inhaled, and dusty asbestos-laden areas are commonplace.

Removing the metal for scrap can potentially cost more than the value of the scrap metal itself. In the developing world, however, shipyards can operate without the risk of personal injury lawsuits or workers' health claims, meaning many of these shipyards may operate with high health risks. Protective equipment is sometimes absent or inadequate. The sandy beaches cannot sufficiently support the heavy equipment, which is thus prone to collapse. Many are injured from explosions when flammable gas is not removed from fuel tanks. In Bangladesh, a local watchdog group claims that, on average, one worker dies per week and one is injured per day.

The problem is caused by negligence from national governments, shipyard operators and former ship owners disregarding the Basel Convention. According to the Institute for Global Labour and Human Rights, workers who attempt to unionize are fired and then blacklisted. The employees have no formal contract or any rights, and sleep in over-crowded hostels. The authorities produce no comprehensive injury statistics, so the problem is underestimated. Child labour is also widespread: 20% of Bangladesh's ship-breaking workforce are below 15 years of age, mainly involved in cutting with gas torches.

There is, however, an active ship-breaker's union in Mumbai, India (Mumbai Port Trust Dock and General Employees' Union) since 2003 with 15,000 members, which strikes to ensure fatality compensation. It has set up a sister branch in Alang, gaining paid holidays and safety equipment for workers since 2005. They hope to expand all along the South Asian coastline.

In the world's largest ship recycling destination, Alang, safety awareness drives with hoardings, posters, films as well as training programmes for different categories of workers under the Safety Training and Labour Welfare Institute, safety evaluation by external teams, personal protective equipment (PPEs) including gloves, gumboot, goggles and masks are provided to workers to mitigate the hazards of their work. In addition to this, GMB has also included regular medical examinations of workers exposed to bio-hazardous materials, provision of medical facilities at the Red Cross Hospital in Alang, mobile medical vans and health awareness programmes.

Several United Nations committees are increasing their coverage of ship-breakers' human rights. In 2006, the International Maritime Organisation developed legally binding global legislation which concerns vessel design, vessel recycling and the enforcement of regulation thereof and a 'Green Passport' scheme. Water-craft must have an inventory of hazardous material before they are scrapped, and the facilities must meet health & safety requirements. The International Labour Organization created a voluntary set of guidelines for occupational safety in 2003. Nevertheless, Greenpeace found that even pre-existing mandatory regulation has had little noticeable effect for labourers, due to government corruption, yard owner secrecy and a lack of interest from countries who prioritise economic growth. There are also guards who look out for any reporters. To safeguard worker health, the report recommends that developed countries create a fund to support their families, certify carriers as 'gas-free' (i.e. safe for cutting) and to remove toxic materials in appropriate facilities before export. To supplement the international treaties, organisations such as the NGO Shipbreaking Platform, the Institute for Global Labour and Human Rights and ToxicsWatch Alliance are lobbying for improvements in the industry.

Environmental risks 
In recent years, ship-breaking has become an issue of environmental concern beyond the health of the yard workers. Many ship-breaking yards operate in developing nations with lax or no environmental law, enabling large quantities of highly toxic materials to escape into the general environment and causing serious health problems among ship-breakers, the local population and wildlife. Environmental campaign groups such as Greenpeace have made the issue a high priority for their activities.

Along the Indian subcontinent, ecologically important mangrove forests, a valuable source of protection from tropical storms and monsoons, have been cut down to provide space for water-craft disassembly. In Bangladesh, for example, 40,000 mangrove trees were illegally chopped down in 2009. The World Bank has found that the country's beaching locations are now at risk from sea level rise. Twenty-one fish and crustacean species have been wiped out in the country as a result of the industry as well. Lead, organotins such as tributyltin in anti-fouling paints, polychlorinated organic compounds, by-products of combustion such as polycyclic aromatic hydrocarbons, dioxins and furans are found in ships and pose a great danger to the environment.

The Basel Convention on the Control of Trans-boundary Movements of Hazardous Wastes and Their Disposal of 1989 has been ratified by 166 countries, including India and Bangladesh, and in 2004, End of Life Ships were subjected to its regulations. It aims to stop the transportation of dangerous substances to less-developed countries and mandate the use of regulated facilities. Furthermore, the decision to scrap a ship is often made in international waters, where the convention has no jurisdiction.

The Hong Kong Convention is a compromise. It allows ships to be exported for recycling, as long as various stipulations are met: All water-craft must have an inventory and every shipyard needs to publish a recycling plan to protect the environment. The Hong Kong Convention was adopted in 2009 but with few countries signing the agreement.

However, nearly 96 of the 120 ship recycling yards in India have achieved Statements of Compliance (SoC) with the Hong Kong Convention by various IACS class societies—including ClassNK, IRClass, Lloyd's Register and RINA. In addition, a yard in Chattogram, Bangladesh has also become the first one to achieve an SoC by ClassNK in January 2020, having first achieved a RINA SoC in 2017. Furthermore, to encourage the growth of India's vital ship recycling sector, in November 2019 the Government of India acceded to the Hong Kong Convention for Safe and Environmentally Sound Recycling of Ships and became the only South Asian country and major ship recycling destination so far to take such a positive step.

In March 2012 the European Commission proposed tougher regulations to ensure all parties take responsibility. Under these rules, if a vessel has a European flag, it must be disposed of in a shipyard on an EU "green list". The facilities would have to show that they are compliant, and it would be regulated internationally in order to bypass corrupt local authorities. However, there is evidence of ship owners changing the flag to evade the regulations. China's scrap industry has vehemently protested against the proposed European regulations. Although Chinese recycling businesses are less damaging than their South Asian counterparts, European and American ship-breakers comply with far more stringent legislation.

That being said, ship recycling yard owners have made investments into upgrading their recycling facilities and safety infrastructure in the recent past, including 100% impervious floors with drainage systems, setting up of hazardous waste processing facilities like the Common Hazardous Wastes Treatment, Storage and Disposal Facility (CHW-TSDF) in Alang, and adherence to various internationally recognised conventions. The ship recycling industry also produces about 4.5 million tons of re-rollable steel per year. That comes up to nearly 2% of total steel produced in India, coming from a process that does not exploit natural resources and thereby saves non-renewable natural resources and energy. Recycling of one ton of scrap saves 1.1 tons of iron ore, 0.6–0.7 tons of coking coal and around 0.2–0.3 tons of fluxes. Specific energy consumption for production of steel through BF-BOF (primary) and EAF& IF (secondary routes) is 14 MJ/kg and 11.7 MJ/kg, respectively. Thus, it leads to savings in energy by 16–17%. It also reduces the water consumption and GHG emission by 40% and 58%, respectively.

List of ship-breaking yards
The following are some of the world's largest ship-breaking yards:

Bangladesh
 Chittagong Ship Breaking Yard at Chittagong

Belgium 
 Galloo, Ghent, formerly Van Heyghen Recycling

China
 Changjiang Ship Breaking Yard, located in Jiangyin, China

India

As of January 2020, India has a 30% share of ship breaking. Once India passes the planned "Recycling of Ships Act, 2019" which ratifies the Hong Kong International Convention for the safe and environmentally sound recycling of ships, ships that are currently not coming for breaking to India from the treaty nations of USA, Europe and Japan will begin arriving in India, thus doubling its global share of ship breaking to 60%. This will also double India's annual ship breaking revenue to US$2.2 billion.

 Alang Ship Breaking Yard
 Steel Industrials Kerala Limited

Pakistan
 Gadani Ship Breaking Yard

Turkey
 Aliağa Ship Breaking Yard, at Aliağa

United Kingdom
 Able UK, Graythorpe Dock, Teesside

United States
 SA Recycling, Brownsville, Texas
 International Shipbreaking, Brownsville, Texas
 Mare Island Dry Docks, Vallejo, California

List of ship breaking yards 
This is a list of notable ship breaking yards:

Gallery

See also

 Bo'ness
 Clemenceau disposal controversy
 Flotsam, jetsam, lagan and derelict
 Marine debris
 Marine pollution
 Shipbreakers (film), by National Film Board of Canada
 Ship decommissioning
 Ship Breaker, a young-adult novel by Paolo Bacigalupi
 Scrap
 Wrecking (shipwreck)
 List of dry docks
 List of the largest shipbuilding companies
 List of shipbuilders and shipyards
 Hardspace: Shipbreaker, a video game based on the ship breaking profession set in space
 Israel Shipyards

References

Further reading
  Contains an extensive section on the shipbreaking industry in India and Bangladesh.
  Ships scrapped include Mauretania and much of the German Fleet at Scapa Flow. Ships listed with owners and dates sold.
  Breaking Ships follows the demise of the Asian Tiger, a ship destroyed at one of the twenty ship-breaking yards along the beaches of Chittagong. BBC Bangladesh correspondent Roland Buerk takes us through the process—from beaching the vessel to its final dissemination, from wealthy shipyard owners to poverty-stricken ship cutters, and from the economic benefits for Bangladesh to the pollution of its once pristine beaches and shorelines.
 
  Analysis of the economics of shipbreaking, the status of worldwide reform efforts, and occupational health and safety of shipbreaking including results of interviewing Alang shipbreakers.
 Siddiquee, N.A. 2004. Impact of ship breaking on marine fish diversity of the Bay of Bengal.DFID SUFER Project, Dhaka, Bangladesh. 46 pp.
 Siddiquee, N. A., Parween, S., and Quddus, M. M. A., Barua, P., 2009 ‘Heavy Metal Pollution in sediments at ship breaking area of Bangladesh ‘Asian Journal of Water, Environment and Pollution, 6 (3) : 7–12

External links

 NGO Platform on Shipbreaking
 OSHA Fact Sheet – Shipbreaking
 Regulatory information on Ship recycling 
 Bangladesh ship breaking photos
 The Ship-Breakers at National Geographic.
 The Ship-Breakers  at National Geographic.
Ship breaking by Drachinifel

 
Demolition
Ship disposal
Vehicle recycling